Civil Lines is a residential neighbourhood in Moradabad, India. It is one of the various Civil Lines neighbourhoods developed by the British Raj for the senior officers in British India. The Moradabad Club is also situated in this neighbourhood. Though a residential neighbourhood, commercial buildings can also be seen in the area. Moradabad's first shopping mall Crossroads Mall also came up in this neighbourhood in 2006. The area also has numerous schools, hospitals and shopping areas. The income tax department building is also located in the neighbourhood.

Educational institutions
 St Mary's Senior Secondary School
 Wilsonia School
 KCM School
 RN Inter College
 Bonne Anne Public School
P.M.S. Public School

Hospitals
 District Hospital
 Railway Hospital
 District Eye Hospital

Recreation and entertainment
 Moradabad Club
 Crossroads Mall
 Ambedkar Park

Notable residents
 Ponty Chadha, Ex Chairman of Wave Group
 Robert Vadra, controversial businessman and son-in-law of Sonia Gandhi

References

Neighbourhoods in Moradabad